Elmer Joseph Hoffman (July 7, 1899 – June 25, 1976) was a U.S. Representative from Illinois.

Born on a farm in Du Page County, near Wheaton, Illinois, Hoffman attended the public schools of Wheaton.  He enlisted in the Artillery Corps during the First World War and served in France.  After the war, he helped operate his father's farm as well as his own trucking firm 1919–1930.  He was employed in Du Page County sheriff's office 1930–1938.  He was sheriff of Du Page County in 1939–1942.  He served as chief deputy sheriff 1943–1946, and then became sheriff again, 1947–1950.  In 1951 he was a probation officer of Du Page County's circuit and county courts.

Hoffman was elected State treasurer in 1952, reelected in 1956 and served until elected to Congress.

Hoffman was elected as a Republican to the Eighty-sixth and to the two succeeding Congresses (January 3, 1959 – January 3, 1965).  He was not a candidate for renomination in 1964 to the Eighty-ninth Congress.

Hoffman resided in Wheaton, Illinois, where he died June 25, 1976.  He was interred in St. Michael's Cemetery.

References

1899 births
1976 deaths
Illinois sheriffs
State treasurers of Illinois
People from Wheaton, Illinois
American trucking industry businesspeople
United States Army personnel of World War I
United States Army soldiers
Republican Party members of the United States House of Representatives from Illinois
20th-century American politicians